The Big Bad Blues is the second studio album by American rock musician Billy Gibbons. The album was released on September 21, 2018, by Concord Records. At the 40th Blues Music Awards, the album was named as 'Blues Rock Album of the Year'.

Critical reception

The Big Bad Blues received generally positive reviews from critics. At Metacritic, which assigns a normalized rating out of 100 to reviews from mainstream publications, the album received an average score of 74, based on four reviews.

Track listing

Personnel
Billy Gibbons: Guitar, Harmonica & Vox 
James Harman: Harmonica
Joe Hardy: Fender Bass Guitar
Elwood Francis: Guitar & Harmonica
Greg Morrow: Drums
Matt Sorum: Drums
Mike Flanigin: Keyboards

Charts

References

2018 albums
Concord Records albums